Rhamphochromis macrophthalmus is a species of piscivorous cichlid endemic to Lake Malawi where it prefers open waters at depths of from .  This species can reach a length of  SL.  It can also be found in the aquarium trade. FishBase treats this species as a valid species, but the Catalog of Fishes treats it as a synonym of Rhamphochromis longiceps, as does the IUCN.

References

macropthalmus
Taxa named by Charles Tate Regan
Fish described in 1922
Taxonomy articles created by Polbot
Taxobox binomials not recognized by IUCN